The 1978 Birmingham WCT was a men's tennis tournament played on indoor carpet courts. It was the sixth edition of the Grand Prix Birmingham, and part of the 1978 Colgate Palmolive Grand Prix. It took place in Birmingham, Alabama, United States from January 9 through January 15, 1978. First-seeded Björn Borg won the singles title and earned $30,000 first-prize money.

Finals

Singles 
 Björn Borg defeated  Dick Stockton 7–6(7–4), 7–5
 It was Borg's 1st singles title of the year and the 31st of his career.

Doubles 
 Vitas Gerulaitis /  Sandy Mayer defeated  Frew McMillan /  Dick Stockton 3–6, 6–1, 7–6

References

External links
 ITF tournament edition details

Birmingham WCT
Birmingham WCT
Birmingham WCT
Birmingham WCT